Chardon is a ghost town in Rawlins County, Kansas, United States.

History
A post office was opened in Chardon in the 1880s, and remained in operation until it was discontinued in 1939.

References

Further reading

External links
 Rawlins County maps: Current, Historic, KDOT

Unincorporated communities in Rawlins County, Kansas
Unincorporated communities in Kansas
1880s establishments in Kansas